Mission Critical is an adventure game released in 1995 by Legend Entertainment. Though its main advertising point was the presence of Star Trek: The Next Generation actor Michael Dorn, he played a very small role in the game. The main author for the game is Legend CEO Mike Verdu. The game also featured a leading role by American actress Patricia Charbonneau, best known for her role in the film Desert Hearts.

The player takes on the role of the sole survivor of the USS Lexington and USS Jericho, a pair of starships sent by the Alliance of Free States that are ambushed on a secret scientific mission to Deneb Kaitos.

Plot
For decades the United Nations (UN) are fuelled by fear against uncontrolled technological development believing it will kill off the human race, have restricted technological growth and research across Earth to extreme levels. A military and political coalition ("the Alliance") was eventually formed among the many influential nations and other interests who came to the decision to refuse to submit to the law and to secede from the United Nations. In response the UN waged a war, taking over the Earth, while the Alliance take their advanced technology (including FTL interstellar travel and unmanned combat drones) into space.

Recently, the Alliance discovers alien ruins on a planet of Deneb Kaitos, a planet which has been named Persephone. The Alliance Interstellar Space Operations Command (AISOC) dispatches the United States Navy's SV Jericho to investigate the ruins, make first contact if aliens are present, and locate any alien technology which might be used to turn the tide of the war. Because the Jericho is unarmed, the light cruiser USS Lexington is assigned as an escort. As the two ships approach Persephone, they are ambushed by the UN Geneva-class vessel UNS Dharma, said to be one of a brand-new class of vessels. The Dharma destroys all the drones in flight from the Lexington. Captain Stephen R. Dayna (played by Michael Dorn) pretends to surrender, and surreptitiously knocks out an officer (the player character) and leaves him behind, on the pretext that he has been killed in the attack. Dayna leaves with the rest of the crew, making it appear that they will evacuate to the Dharma using the inter-ship shuttle carried aboard the Lexington. Executive officer Jennifer Tran leaves behind a message for the player character and places an armed nuclear warhead taken from one of the ship's missiles into a compartment aboard the shuttle, and programs it so that a proximity detonation will occur just as the transport shuttle docks, destroying the UN ship and killing the crews of Jericho and Lexington, in order to buy time so that the player character might be able to complete the mission before the arrival of more UN ships.

The player character awakens on deck 2 of the Lexington's habitat module. A hastily penned letter from Dayna explains his situation. Battle damage has produced a serious hull breach in a stateroom and a meltdown about to occur in the ship's fission reactor. Once those crises have been solved, the player character restores full functionality to the ship's computer, where he finds the pre-recorded message left by Lexington XO Jennifer Tran. This last message explains the need to get into contact with higher headquarters. This requires running diagnostics, scavenging parts, then conducting an EVA to repair the ship's communications dish. By manually choosing a path of transmission to avoid the compromised portions of the Alliance network, contact is established with an Alliance military command center, located in a domed colony on a planet named Erebus, orbiting 70 Ophiuchi.

Once the player contacts Erebus, Alliance Fleet Admiral Charles Decker (played by Henry Strozier), reluctantly reveals the reason for the Lexington's mission to Persephone, telling of the unknown structure there. However, now that secrecy has been lost, both sides are dispatching reinforcements to Persephone. Decker knows that the UN task force will reach the planet first and Alliance reinforcement is months away, and orders the player character to abandon the mission rather than be killed. Choosing to obey this order will finish the game prematurely.

Decker also reveals that there's an experimental weapon aboard Lexington called Hype. Hype is a mix of nanomachines and neurochemicals that rewires the brain for an interface with the ship's computers, allowing a human to control the automated fighter drones. Without Hype, battle progresses too fast for a human to control remotely. Hype has a side effect: it inevitably kills the person who uses it.

After the player character defends the Lexington from three UN attacks, he descends to Persephone and investigates the alien ruins. He discovers an alien intelligence, which created a portal that transported him through space and time into the future: to 2295.

The game presents two different sets of future events: the 'normal' one that follows from UN victory; the player will visit this future where he learns that the Alliance ships were ambushed, the mission was never completed, and more UN ships arrived at Persephone and destroyed the ruins with nuclear bombs. With the Alliance already on the losing side, the loss of alien technology ensures the UN's victory. The war ended and the restriction on AI is finally imposed on all worlds.

However, decades after the war, a group of underground scientists on a colony called Prometheus secretly created ELFs (electronic life-forms) on a remote outpost. When the UN finds out, they send a fleet to destroy the outpost and make sure no scientist or ELF survives. Although the outpost is obliterated, several ELFs survive. The surviving ELFs evolve and build their own war machines with which to strike back. The humans had no chance - the ELFs evolved too fast. A survival plan was put into motion: two thousand humans would be sent in a ship with only sublight engine to a star system not connected to the Tal-Seto network; the UN military command would then activate a "Tal-Seto collapser", causing the network to fold in on itself. The fold will affect everything within its radius; only the human ship will escape, and all FTL jumpnode will be severed. The ELFs will be trapped in their home system and remain there forever. They knew about the collapsing node, but can't create a solution to it if they can't connect to the "community", and the collapse would eventually consume the entire galaxy and their entire existence will be doomed. The collapse is creating a singularity, so even if they sent their own colony ship they wouldn't be able to escape. Their only hope lies in preventing these events from happening in the first place. They intuit that the ancient ruins on Persephone could be the answer.

The player agrees to help the ELFs. The ELFs state that they can send back only the player's memory, into the hours before Lexington entered Persephone's orbit. The player's memories and knowledge are transferred back to his mind prior to the introductory events; the alternate (and canonical) storyline is then triggered.

The player must prevent UNS Dharma from defeating the Lexington and the Jericho. Having retained all memories from the 'original' timeline, the player alerts Commander Dana about UNS Dharma and injects himself with Hype. Once the Dharma is destroyed, the alien technology found on Persephone turns the tide of the war, allowing the Alliance to defeat the UN and repeal the technology limitation law. The ELFs are created and are welcomed by humans as equals. In the new 2295, Earth no longer exists. Humans now live on a Dyson Sphere which has been constructed by the two races with the humans living on the inside, and the ELFs on the outside. The game ends with player character contemplating about the meaning of human existence, and the ELFs grow to explore facets of the multiverse that are outside the realm of human understanding.

Gameplay
Mission Critical has a varied mixture of gameplay formats, including a large number of traditional object puzzles, Myst-style backstory deduction from fragments of evidence found about the ship, a couple of fiddle puzzles, and a real time strategy minigame, in which the player must defend the ship from two waves of enemy vessels. Certain puzzles are timed, though no easy way is provided to gauge the amount of time that has passed.

Battles are controlled from a tactical computer interface on the ship's bridge. There is an analogue difficulty slider (which sets the battles to win themselves on the lowest setting) and a speed control slider. The relatively low-ranking player character must get authorization from command to use the tactical system, then modify the ship's systems to enable it to be controlled single-handed, then complete several training missions of increasing difficulty and varying strategy before being able to defend the ship proper. The attacks are timed and usually occur when the player is attempting to do something elsewhere on the ship, and he must scramble to the bridge and fight them off before returning to what he was working on.

Graphics and sound
The bulk of the game consists of 3D renderings (the entirety of the spaceship, and several other locations), presented in static screens with transitional animations between most areas. Cutscenes are in full screen video with live actors. A few locations use a mixture of computer generated images and highly detailed, hand-painted backdrops, with some 2D animation effects to compensate for the lack of transition movies in these parts.

The game uses stereo sampled voice and sound effects. Music is via MIDI, although the FMV cutscenes have the music incorporated in the sampled soundtrack.

Reception

A Next Generation critic lauded the game's "fantastic graphics and edge-of-your-seat storyline", a combination which he said is rare in video games. He also found the purely mouse-driven interface to be simple and intuitive, but said that the game is "too easy and way too short." He scored it four out of five stars, but concluded that gamers with limited budgets should pass it up in favor of something that would offer more play time.

In PC Gamer US, William R. Trotter called Mission Critical "a big, sleek, handsome" product. He summarized it as "a mature and thought-provoking adventure that plays the way a good science fiction novel reads." John Voorhees of Computer Games Strategy Plus wrote that it is "an innovative, entertaining game with a lot to offer the adventure buff." However, he felt that the writers should have let the visuals "speak for themselves" instead of describing everything in the world, in the fashion of the company's earlier interactive fiction.

Mission Critical won Computer Game Reviews 1995 "Adventure Game of the Year" award. The editors wrote that it "proved once again that Legend is able to rewrite the adventure game genre to its liking whenever it wants to." It also received the magazine's "Best Graphics of the Year" prize. Jerry Pournelle of Byte selected it as his overall "Game of the Year", and it was a finalist for Computer Games Strategy Pluss "Adventure Game of the Year" prize, which ultimately went to The Beast Within: A Gabriel Knight Mystery.

In 2000, a Computer Games Strategy Plus retrospective said of Mission Critical, "A terrific storyline, excellent puzzles and a superb tactical combat engine (!) made this the best of Legend's many quality adventure offerings."

Legacy
There is a sequel paperback novel Mission Critical: Death of the Phoenix - A Novel that was published in 1996 by Paul Chafe, and is canon to the same franchise. The novel was published and distributed separately, telling a story that is separate, but with references to, events which occurred in the game.

The protagonist in the book is Lewis Tyrell, formerly an infantry captain who led a small unit of the 'Pathfinders'. In the story, the Pathfinders were once a United Nations special operations organization commissioned to steal prototype of the HYPE serum from an Alliance base in the Tehachapi mountains—but after the war they were disbanded, since the United Nations lost the war after the player's actions in the game. From this perspective, the book details Tyrell's extensive postwar adventures. These begin after he is treated like an incorrigible criminal, and sent to serve out a life sentence in a prison located at Mare Stellatis and his attempts to escape.

AC Lexington, the ship where the game takes place, makes a cameo. The protagonist will eventually visit Persephone and the time gate seen in the game, and names such as 60 Ophiuchi, Deneb Kaitos and the Erebus base known from the game, are also mentioned. However the Alliance (who are now the government) is now painted in a poor light, showing signs of the same totalitarianism and cruelty the UN was once accused of. The book provides even more detail than the game about the history, society and politics of the universe.

References

External links
Archive of the official site

Timeline of the game's background and events

1995 video games
Adventure games
DOS games
DOS-only games
Novels based on video games
Piko Interactive games
Science fiction video games
Single-player video games
Video games developed in the United States
Video games set in the 22nd century
Legend Entertainment games